Pseudomonas cuatrocienegasensis is a Gram-negative, non-spore-forming and rod-shaped bacterium from the genus of Pseudomonas.

References

Pseudomonadales
Bacteria described in 2009